John William Frain (born 8 October 1968) is an English former professional footballer who played for Birmingham City and Northampton Town. He played in all four divisions of the Football League, making nearly 500 league appearances for his two clubs.

Life and career
Frain was born in Yardley, Birmingham. He joined Birmingham City from school, made his debut in the First Division in April 1986 aged 17, and signed full professional forms in October of that year. He was originally a left back, but good passing ability and a lack of pace saw him moved into midfield, towards the end of his Birmingham career returning to left-back. He was the club's free kick and penalty specialist. He was part of the team that won the Associate Members' Cup in 1990-91 and gained promotion from the Third Division in 1991–92. He was the club's Player of the Year for 1994. He also appeared in the club's 1994–95 Third Division championship-winning season and in the early rounds of that year's Football League Trophy, but played insufficient games to qualify for a league medal and did not play in the final. In 1996, he was awarded a testimonial match against Aston Villa in recognition of ten years' service. He made 336 appearances for the club in all competitions, scoring 28 goals.

In January 1997 Frain joined Northampton Town on loan, writing himself into the club's history by scoring a stoppage-time winner from a free kick in that season's Third Division play-off final. His free-transfer move to the club was made permanent at the end of that season. He later played his part in the club winning automatic promotion back to the Second Division in 1999–2000. He made 248 appearances for the club in all competitions, scoring 8 goals.

In July 2003 Frain was appointed player/assistant manager of Moor Green. In his first season, he helped the club reach the final of the Southern League Cup and win the Birmingham Senior Cup, beating Wolverhampton Wanderers in the final. Frain retired as a player at the end of the 2004–05 season due to a persistent knee injury, but retained his assistant manager's post following the merger of Moor Green and Solihull Borough to form Solihull Moors, until he resigned in August 2008.

Frain combined his football duties with working as a mortgage underwriter. His brother Peter played as a forward for West Bromwich Albion and Mansfield Town.

Honours
Birmingham City
 Associate Members' Cup: 1990–91
 Third Division promotion: 1991–92
Northampton Town
 Third Division play-offs: 1997
 Third Division promotion: 1999–2000
Moor Green
 Southern League Cup: 2004
 Birmingham Senior Cup: 2004

References
General
 
Specific

External links
 

1968 births
Living people
Footballers from Birmingham, West Midlands
English footballers
Association football defenders
Association football midfielders
Birmingham City F.C. players
Northampton Town F.C. players
Moor Green F.C. players
English Football League players
Southern Football League players